Lieutenant-Colonel Arthur Louis Hamilton Buchanan (1866 – 15 February 1925) was a Coalition Unionist Party MP for Coatbridge from 1918 to 1922.

He was appointed a Lieutenant in the 4th Battalion of the Devonshire Regiment with effect from 16 February 1884, and transferred to the Gordon Highlanders on 28 April 1886. He was appointed Lieutenant-Colonel of the 3rd Battalion, the Gordon Highlanders from 2 June 1906.

References

External links 
 

1866 births
1925 deaths
Members of the Parliament of the United Kingdom for Scottish constituencies
Unionist Party (Scotland) MPs
UK MPs 1918–1922
Deputy Lieutenants of Lanarkshire
Devonshire Regiment officers
Gordon Highlanders officers